Best of the Early Years is a compilation album released by They Might Be Giants on November 29, 1999. It is a truncated version of Then: The Earlier Years, including 10 of the seventy-two featured on Then. It was released at the same time as Live, which itself was a condensed version of TMBG's live album Severe Tire Damage.

Two versions of the CD were released with different track orders.  The original version has since been discontinued.  Cassette versions of the album featured tracks 1–8 of the original track listing.

Track listing
All songs by They Might Be Giants unless otherwise noted.
 "Don't Let's Start" – 2:36
 "Ana Ng" – 3:23
 "Youth Culture Killed My Dog" (John Flansburgh, John Linnell) –2:51
 "We're the Replacements" – 1:50
 "Put Your Hand Inside the Puppet Head" (Flansburgh, Linnell) – 2:12
 "Purple Toupee" – 2:40
 "(She Was A) Hotel Detective" – 2:10
 "Everything Right Is Wrong Again" – 2:20
 "Cowtown" – 2:21
 "Hide Away Folk Family" – 3:21

Original track listing
"Ana Ng" - 3:23
"Purple Toupee" - 2:40
"Youth Culture Killed My Dog" - 2:51
"Don't Let's Start" - 2:36
"Put Your Hand Inside the Puppet Head" - 2:12
"(She Was A) Hotel Detective" - 2:10
"Everything Right Is Wrong Again" - 2:20
"Cowtown" - 2:21
"We're the Replacements" - 1:50
"Hide Away Folk Family" - 3:21

References

External links
Best of the Early Years at This Might Be A Wiki

1999 greatest hits albums
They Might Be Giants compilation albums